This is a list of seasons completed by the Minnesota Wild professional ice hockey club of the National Hockey League. This list documents the records and playoff results for all seasons the Wild have completed in the NHL since their inception in 2000. They have won a playoff series four times in 22 years, half of which came in 2003, their only appearance in a Conference Final.

Table key

Year by year

1 Season was cancelled due to the 2004–05 NHL lockout.
2 As of the 2005–06 NHL season, all games tied after regulation will be decided in a shootout; SOL (Shootout losses) will be recorded as OTL in the standings.
3 The 2012–13 NHL season was shortened due to the 2012–13 NHL lockout.
4 The 2019–20 NHL season was suspended on March 12, 2020 due to the COVID-19 pandemic.
5 Due to the COVID-19 pandemic, the 2020–21 NHL season was shortened to 56 games.

All-time records

References

 
seasons
National Hockey League team seasons
Minnesota Wild